Friedrich Bohry is a retired slalom canoeist who competed for West Germany in the mid-1960s. He won a bronze medal in the C-2 team event at the 1965 ICF Canoe Slalom World Championships in Spittal.

References

German male canoeists
Possibly living people
Year of birth missing (living people)
Medalists at the ICF Canoe Slalom World Championships